Borja Gil Albarracín (born 4 December 1990) is a Spanish footballer who plays as a winger.

Club career
Born in Ceuta, Gil finished his youth career with Real Valladolid, and made his senior debut with Murallas de Ceuta FC in the 2009–10 season, in the Tercera División. In August 2010 he joined Unión Estepona CF of Segunda División B, and featured sparingly for the side during the campaign, being also relegated.

Gil moved to fellow league team CF Villanovense on 6 July 2011. One year later, he signed for Lucena CF also in the third division. After suffering a knee injury, he terminated his contract on 29 December 2012.

On 15 January 2013, Gil joined Real Murcia, initially assigned to the reserves in the fourth tier. On 21 April he made his first-team debut, coming on as a late substitute in a 1–1 away draw against FC Barcelona B in the Segunda División.

Gil rejected a new deal in July 2013, and later signed for hometown club AD Ceuta FC. On 10 July of the following year he moved to UB Conquense, being deemed surplus to requirements a month later.

Gil severed his ties with Conquense in November 2014, and returned to Ceuta in January 2015. He continued to play in lower-league or amateur football until his retirement, also having a spell in the Gibraltar Premier Division with Lincoln Red Imps FC.

References

External links

 

1990 births
Living people
People from Ceuta
Spanish footballers
Association football wingers
Segunda División players
Segunda División B players
Tercera División players
CF Villanovense players
Lucena CF players
Real Murcia Imperial players
Real Murcia players
UB Conquense footballers
Yeclano Deportivo players
UD Ibiza players
Mar Menor FC players
Gibraltar Premier Division players
Lincoln Red Imps F.C. players
Spanish expatriate footballers
Expatriate footballers in Gibraltar
Spanish expatriate sportspeople in Gibraltar